Xerolenta obvia is a species of air-breathing land snail, a terrestrial gastropod mollusk in the family Geomitridae, the hairy snails and their allies.

Distribution 

This land snail occurs in European countries including Hungary, Bulgaria, Czech Republic, Italy, Poland, Slovakia, Ukraine, Canada (Bethany, Ontario, Canada first detected in 1969 and 1972; at least 23 occurrences in southern Ontario as of 2015), United States of America (Wayne County, Michigan Detected in 2002 - B. Sullivan)  and others.

This species in the USA is considered to represent a potentially serious threat as  a pest, an invasive species which could negatively affect agriculture, natural ecosystems, human health or commerce. Therefore, it has been suggested that this species be given top national quarantine significance in the USA.

Description
Shells of Xerolenta obvia are medium-sized (7–10 mm high, 14–20 mm wide) and relatively flat. In the adult stage, 5 to 6 turns are present. These shells are usually thick and smooth, with a white or yellowish-white basic color and quite variable, dark brown to almost black bands. The body is yellowish-brown.

Life cycle 
The size of the egg is 1.5 mm.

Gallery

References

 Westerlund, C. A. &. Blanc, H. (1879). Aperçu sur la faune malacologique de la Grèce inclus l'Epire et la Thessalie. Coquilles extramarines. 161 pp. + errata (1 pp.), pl. 1-4.
 Bank, R. A.; Neubert, E. (2017). Checklist of the land and freshwater Gastropoda of Europe. Last update: July 16th, 2017

External links 
 Clessin, S. (1879). Aus meiner Novitäten-Mappe. Malakozoologische Blätter. Neue Folge. 1: 3–16.

Geomitridae
Gastropods described in 1828